Łagiewniki  is a village in the administrative district of Gmina Chmielnik, within Kielce County, Świętokrzyskie Voivodeship, in south-central Poland.

The village has a population of 590.

In Łagiewniki there is a mental disorder care institution with a chapel where every Sunday there is Holy Masses taking place. In the Mass take part the patients of the institution as well as inhabitants of Łagiewniki.

Part of Łagiewniki is called "Źródła" (Springs). There is an old and not functioning water mill called "Amerykański Młyn na Źródłach" (American Mill on the Springs). The name is said to come from the fact that the mill was built according to American design (probably beginning of 19th century) and also because there are water springs in the area including just under the Mill's Building.

The Mill is made of limestone (walls) and wood. During the Second World War part of the mill (over the mill wheel) was blown up by the Nazis. After that the mill wheel has been fixed but the building has not been rebuilt.

During the Second World War, there was a Jewish family hiding in the mill.

The last miller was Roman Ścieżka. Just after his death "the unknown perpetrators" have destroyed some of the mill infrastructure based on the river leading to the mill and the authorities have used this fact to withdraw the permission for using the mill. Soon the main springs area has been expropriated by the authorities and the course of the river leading to the mill has been changed leaving the water mill with no river. There has been a water intake plant built.

The Źródła springs are now water supply source for Chmielnik and Busko-Zdrój communities.

References

Villages in Kielce County